Acidithiobacillus is a genus of the Acidithiobacillia in the "Pseudomonadota". The genus includes acidophilic organisms capable of iron and/or sulfur oxidation. Like all "Pseudomonadota", Acidithiobacillus spp. are Gram-negative. They are also important generators of acid mine drainage, which is a major environmental problem around the world in mining.

Genus Acidithiobacillus
Acidithiobacillus are acidophilic obligate autotrophs (Acidithiobacillus caldus can also grow mixotrophically) that use elementary sulfur, tetrathionate and ferrous iron as electron donors. They assimilate carbon from carbon dioxide using the transaldolase variant of the Calvin-Benson-Bassham cycle. The genus comprises motile, rod-shaped cells that can be isolated from low pH environments including low pH microenvironments on otherwise neutral mineral grains.

Phylogeny 

The order Acidithiobacillales (i.e. Thermithiobacillus) were formerly members of the Gammaproteobacteria, with considerable debate regarding their position and that they could also fall within the Betaproteobacteria, but the situation was resolved by whole-genome alignment studies and both genera have been reclassified to the new class Acidithiobacillia. 

Some members of this genus were classified as Thiobacillus spp., before they were reclassified in 2000.
 Acidithiobacillus ferrooxidans (basonym Thiobacillus ferrooxidans)  can be isolated from iron-sulfur minerals such as pyrite deposits, oxidising iron and sulfur as energy sources to support autotrophic growth and producing ferric iron and sulfuric acid.
 Acidithiobacillus thiooxidans (basonym Thiobacillus thiooxidans, Thiobacillus concretivorus) oxidises sulfur and produces sulfuric acid; first isolated from the soil, it has also been observed causing biogenic sulfide corrosion of concrete sewer pipes by altering hydrogen sulfide in sewage gas into sulfuric acid.

Bioleaching
Species within Acidothiobacillus are used in the biohydrometallurgy industry in methods called bioleaching and biomining, whereby metals are extracted from their ores through bacterial oxidation. Biomining uses radioactive waste as an ore with the bacteria to obtain gold, platinum, polonium, radon, radium, uranium, neptunium, americium, nickel, manganese, bromine, mercury, and their isotopes. 

Acidithiobacillus ferrooxidans has emerged as an economically significant bacterium in the field of biohydrometallurgy, in the leaching of sulfide ores since its discovery in 1950 by Colmer, Temple and Hinkle. The discovery of A. ferrooxidans led to the development of  “biohydrometallurgy”, which deals with all aspects of microbial mediated extraction of metals from minerals or solid wastes and acid mine drainage. A. ferrooxidans has been proven as a potent leaching organism, for dissolution of metals from low-grade sulfide ores. Recently, the attention has been focused upon the treatment of mineral concentrates, as well as complex sulfide ores using batch or continuous-flow reactors.

Acidithiobacillus ferrooxidans is commonly found in acid mine drainage and mine tailings. The oxidation of ferrous iron and reduced sulfur oxyanions, metal sulfides and elementary sulfur results in the production of ferric sulfate in sulfuric acid, this in turn causes the solubilization of metals and other compounds. As a result, A. ferrooxidans may be of interest for bioremediation processes. Acidithiobacillus is also commonly abundant upon inner surfaces of sewers in areas exhibiting corrosion; Genetic Sequencing identifies Acidothiobacillus thiooxidans as the usual species present, although it is occasionally absent from such locations.

Morphology
Acidithiobacillus spp. occur as single cells or occasionally in pairs or chains, depending on growth conditions. Highly motile species have been described, as well as nonmotile ones. Motile strains have a single flagellum with the exception of A. albertensis, which has a tuft of polar flagella and a glycocalyx. Nitrogen fixation also is an important ecological function carried out by some species in this genus, as is growth using molecular hydrogen as a source of energy - neither property is found in every species. Ferric iron can be used by some species as a terminal electron acceptor.

See also 
 Talvivaara mine
 Thiobacillus
 Thermithiobacillus
 Acidophiles in acid mine drainage

References

External links
 Acidithiobacillus ferrooxidans ATCC 23270 Genome Page
 Thiobacillus sp.
Type strain of Acidithiobacillus ferrooxidans at BacDive -  the Bacterial Diversity Metadatabase

Acidithiobacillia
Bacteria genera